Nicholas Thomas Peter George (born 29 February 1972) is  an English cricketer.  George is a left-handed batsman who bowls right-arm medium pace.  He was born at Penzance, Cornwall.

George made his Minor Counties Championship debut for Cornwall in 1995 against Wales Minor Counties.  From 1995 to 2006, he represented the county in 31 Minor Counties Championship matches, the last of which came against Wiltshire.  George also represented Cornwall in the MCCA Knockout Trophy.  His debut in that competition came against Dorset in 1999.  From 1999 to 2005, he represented the county in 10 Trophy matches, the last of which came against Wiltshire.

George has also represented Cornwall in 2 List A matches.  These came both against Cheshire in the 1st round of the 2001 Cheltenham & Gloucester Trophy and in the 1st round of the 2002 Cheltenham & Gloucester Trophy which was played in 2001.  In his 2 List A matches, he took a single wickets at a bowling average of 49.00, with best figures of 1/49.

Family
His brother Mark also represented Cornwall in Minor Counties and List A cricket.

References

External links
Nicholas George at Cricinfo
Nicholas George at CricketArchive

1972 births
Living people
Sportspeople from Penzance
English cricketers
Cornwall cricketers